Juan Bravo Murillo (24 June 1803 – 11 February 1873) was a Spanish politician, jurist and economist. He was president of the council of ministers of Spain (equivalent to the present-day position of prime minister / president of the government) from 14 January 1851 to 14 December 1852 during the reign of Isabella II.

Origins
Bravo Murillo was born in Fregenal de la Sierra on 24 June 1803. After briefly studying theology, he studied law at the University of Salamanca and the University of Seville, obtaining his licentiate from Seville in 1825. He practiced law for a time in Seville. After the death of Fernando VII in 1833 he was named prosecutor of the Audiencia Provincial of Cádiz, a position he held for two years before moving to Madrid, where he co-published a journal called Boletín de Jurisprudencia. He was also a founder of the conservative newspaper El Porvenir.

Political career 
He was elected a deputy (member of the lower house of Spain's parliament) in 1837 and 1840 as a member of the Moderate Party. However, his reactionary views kept him out of leadership during the decidedly liberal ascendancy of General Baldomero Espartero, regent during this portion of the minority of Isabella II. He emigrated briefly to France after the Spanish Revolution of 1841, but returned in 1843 after Espartero's fall, the beginning of the década moderada.

In January 1847 he was named Minister of Grace and Justice in the government of Carlos Martínez de Irujo, Duke of Sotomayor. General Ramón María Narváez later named him Minister of Commerce, Instruction, and Public Works, then in 1849 Minister of Finance. He was named President of the Council of Ministers of Spain, effectively prime minister, taking office on 14 January 1851, while serving as his own Minister of Finance. The events of the Revolutions of 1848 throughout Europe led him to propose an anti-parliamentarian, absolutist constitution for Spain in 1852, countering the moderate liberal tendency of the Spanish Constitution of 1845, but it proved unpopular and was rejected. He lost his position as head of government 14 December 1852; the onset of the bienio progresista some 18 months later led him to leave Spain, returning in 1856. He served as President of the Congress of Deputies in 1858, and was named to the Spanish Senate in 1863 as a senator for life.

He is responsible for founding Canal de Isabel II, the public company that still brings water to Madrid, the establishment of civil service exams (oposiciones), the introduction of the metric system into Spain in 1849, the Concordat of 1851 that settled differences between the Spanish government and the Holy See, and the 1852 Law of Free Ports of the Canaries. He was also responsible for a variety of measures in his capacity as minister of finance, and founded what later became the Boletín Oficial del Estado, which remains the Spanish government's official gazette to this day.

The most interesting of his writings were published in six volumes entitled Opúsculos ("Pamphlets", 1863–1874). He died in Madrid 11 February 1873.

Elections to Congress of Deputies
Bravo Murillo was elected to the Congress of Deputies on 12 occasions, and represented constituencies in five different provinces (sometimes two of them at the same time):

Source:

Ministers in his governments

First ministry
President: Juan Bravo Murillo
State: Manuel Bertrán de Lis y Ribes
Finance: Juan Bravo Murillo
Grace and Justice: Ventura González Romero
Governance: Fermín Arteta
War: Rafael de Arístegui (Count of Mirasol)
Marine: José María Bustillo (Count of Bustillo)
Development: Santiago Fernández Negrete
Source:

Second (reorganized) ministry
President: Juan Bravo Murillo
State: Manuel Pando Fernández de Pineda (Marquis of Miraflores); later Manuel Bertrán de Lis Ribes returned to the position.
Finance: Juan Bravo Murillo
Grace and Justice: Ventura González Romero
Governance: Manuel Bertrán de Lis Ribes, later Melchor Ordóñez and Cristóbal Bordíu
War: Francisco Alejandro Lersundi y Ormaechea, later Cayetano Urbina y Daoiz
Marine: Francisco Armero de Peñaranda (Marquess of Nervión), later Joaquín Ezpeleta y Enrile
Development: Fermín Arteta, later Mariano Miguel Reinoso
Source:

Notes

1803 births
1873 deaths
Spanish jurists
Spanish economists
19th-century Spanish people
Economy and finance ministers of Spain
Prime Ministers of Spain
Presidents of the Congress of Deputies (Spain)
Moderate Party (Spain) politicians
19th-century Spanish politicians
University of Seville alumni
University of Salamanca alumni